Morillon is a commune in the Haute-Savoie department in the Auvergne-Rhône-Alpes region in south-eastern France.

It is a popular summer and winter vacation destination. Morillon is great for families and holds the prestigious Famille Plus Montagne label for its excellent facilities for families and children.

Ski
Morillon has a Poma télécabine that departs from just outside the village and links up to the Grand Massif ski area consisting of 265 km of ski runs over the five resorts of Morillon, Samoëns, Flaine, Les Carroz, and Sixt.  Morillon is also the home ski area of the 2006 Winter Olympic's Downhill Gold Medalist Antoine Dénériaz. Above the village at Morillon 1100, also known as Les Esserts, there are many apartments benefiting from ski-in ski-out holiday options.

The Grand Massif ski area consists of 145 slopes: 18 green runs, 67 blue runs, 46 red runs and 14 black runs.

Climate

Miscellaneous
Morillon also has a small lake which is surrounded by numerous activities including an adventure park for children and adults alike ages 3+. Other sports include trampolining, volleyball and horse riding. White water rafting on the River Giffre, mountain biking, Canyoning, quad biking and tennis are available.  Morillon and Samoëns are close together in the valley and share many activities.

Pinot noir from this region is commonly bottled under the Morillon label.

See also
Communes of the Haute-Savoie department

References

External links

 
 Gazetteer Entry for Morillon
 Ski area website: http://www.grand-massif.com/
 Local site of Morillon: http://www.ot-morillon.fr/

Communes of Haute-Savoie